The Kaufmann vortex, also known as the Scully model, is a mathematical model for a vortex taking account of viscosity. It uses an algebraic velocity profile. This vortex is not a solution of the Navier–Stokes equations.

Kaufmann and Scully's model for the velocity in the Θ direction is:

The model was suggested by W. Kaufmann in 1962, and later by Scully and Sullivan in 1972 at the Massachusetts Institute of Technology.

See also
 Rankine vortex – a simpler, but more crude, approximation for a vortex.
 Lamb–Oseen vortex – the exact solution for a free vortex decaying due to viscosity.

References

Equations of fluid dynamics
Vortices